Frank Sherwin may refer to:
 Frank Sherwin (politician) (1905–1981), Irish independent politician
 Frank Sherwin (artist) (1896–1986), English artist